Vaidotas is a Lithuanian masculine given name. The diminutive of the name is Vaidas. People with the name Vaidotas include:
Vaidotas (fl. 1362), Lithuanian noble, son of Kęstutis, Grand Duke of Lithuania
Vaidotas Šilėnas (born 1985), Lithuanian footballer 
Vaidotas Šlekys (born 1972), Lithuanian footballer
Vaidotas Valiukevičius (born 1981), Lithuanian musician, lead singer of the Lithuanian pop rock band The Roop

References

Lithuanian masculine given names